Ragni Hestad (born 5 September 1968) is a Norwegian beach volleyball player, born in Bergen. She competed in the women's tournament at the 1996 Summer Olympics in Atlanta, with team mate Merita Berntsen.

References

External links

1968 births
Living people
Sportspeople from Bergen
Norwegian beach volleyball players
Olympic beach volleyball players of Norway 
Beach volleyball players at the 1996 Summer Olympics